Jack Hoult (birth unknown – death unknown) was a professional rugby league footballer who played in the 1920s and 1930s, and competitive cyclist of the 1930s.

Background
Jack Hoult worked at British Oil and Cake Mills in Kingston upon Hull.

Playing career

Challenge Cup Final appearances
Jack Hoult played left-, i.e. number 4, in the Hull Kingston Rovers' 3–16 defeat by Oldham in the 1924–25 Challenge Cup Final during the 1924–25 season at Headingley Rugby Stadium, Leeds on Saturday 25 April 1925, in front of a crowd of 28,335.

County League appearances
Jack Hoult played in Castleford's victory in the Yorkshire County League during the 1932–33 season.

References

External links
Search for "Hoult" at rugbyleagueproject.org
Jack Hoult Memory Box Search at archive.castigersheritage.com
Search for "Jack Hoult" at britishnewspaperarchive.co.uk
Search for "John Hoult" at britishnewspaperarchive.co.uk

Castleford Tigers players
Dewsbury Rams players
English rugby league players
Hull Kingston Rovers players
Place of birth missing
Place of death missing
Rugby league centres
Rugby league five-eighths
Year of birth missing
Year of death missing
York Wasps players
Yorkshire rugby league team players